Michael (Michalis) Mouroutsos (born February 29, 1980 in Langadia, Arcadia, Greece) is an Olympic taekwondo gold medalist from Greece. He became the inaugural Olympic champion in the men's -58 kg division at the 2000 Summer Olympics in Sydney.

References

External links
 
 
 

1980 births
Living people
Greek male taekwondo practitioners
Olympic taekwondo practitioners of Greece
Olympic gold medalists for Greece
Taekwondo practitioners at the 2000 Summer Olympics
Taekwondo practitioners at the 2004 Summer Olympics
Olympic medalists in taekwondo
European champions for Greece
Medalists at the 2000 Summer Olympics
Universiade medalists in taekwondo
Universiade bronze medalists for Greece
European Taekwondo Championships medalists
Medalists at the 2005 Summer Universiade
People from Langadia, Arcadia
Sportspeople from the Peloponnese
20th-century Greek people
21st-century Greek people
Survivor Greece contestants